Osmanen Germania or Osmanen Germania BC (OGBC) was a Turkish-nationalistic and extreme right criminal gang in Germany. It was formed some time between late 2014 and April 2015 and banned by the Federal Ministry of the Interior under Horst Seehofer in 2018. At the time of its dissolution, it had 16 chapters and 300 members.

According to authorities in North Rhine-Westphalia, the gang had connections with the Turkish government party AKP and Turkish president Recep Tayyip Erdogan. Several members of the OGBC have connections to the fascist Grey Wolves organisation. The OGBC were in involved in conflicts with the "Kurdish-friendly" gang Bahoz and also in internal fighting between OGBC chapters.

In the state of Baden-Württemberg its activities involved attempted murder, assault, blackmailing, prostitution, kidnapping as well as narcotics and gun crime.

In 2016, OGBC members received pay from the German government to guard refugee centres during the European migrant crisis.

Some of the court proceedings against OGBC members took place in the high security premises of Stammheim Prison.

References 

 
Crime in Germany
Nationalism in Germany
Turkish nationalist organizations